Coloncito may refer to:

Coloncito, Panama
Coloncito, Táchira